"Shadow of a Doubt" is a song written by Tom Wopat and Robert Byrne, and recorded by American country music artist Earl Thomas Conley. It was released in May 1991 as the first single from the album Yours Truly.  The song reached number 8 on the Billboard Hot Country Singles & Tracks chart.

Chart performance
"Shadow of a Doubt" debuted on the U.S. Billboard Hot Country Singles & Tracks for the week of June 1, 1991.

Year-end charts

References

1991 singles
1991 songs
Earl Thomas Conley songs
Songs written by Robert Byrne (songwriter)
RCA Records singles
Song recordings produced by Richard Landis